The 1998 ITT Automotive Detroit Grand Prix was a Championship Auto Racing Teams (CART) race that was held on June 7, 1998, on the Raceway on Belle Isle in Detroit, Michigan. It was the eighth race of the 1998 CART FedEx Champ Car World Series season. The race was won by Alex Zanardi for Chip Ganassi Racing. Adrián Fernández finished second, and Gil de Ferran clinched third.

Classification

Race

Caution flags

Lap Leaders

Point standings after race

References 

Detroit Grand Prix
ITT Automotive Detroit Grand Prix
Detroit Indy Grand Prix
ITT Automotive Detroit Grand Prix
ITT Automotive Detroit Grand Prix